The 1993 Sun Belt Conference men's basketball tournament was held March 6–9 at the Mississippi Coast Coliseum in Biloxi, Mississippi.

 defeated top-seeded New Orleans in the championship game, 72–63, to win their first Sun Belt men's basketball tournament.

The Hilltoppers, in turn, received an automatic bid to the 1993 NCAA tournament. Fellow Sun Belt member New Orleans joined them in the tournament, earning an at-large bid.

Format
Central Florida departed for the TAAC after a one-year stay in the Sun Belt, leaving the conference with only ten teams.

As such, the tournament again saw some changes. Firstly, the tournament field decreased from eleven to nine teams (UTPA, the last-placed team in the Sun Belt standings, did not participate). With all teams seeded based on regular-season conference records, the top seven teams were all placed into the quarterfinal round while the two lowest-seeded teams (besides last-placed UTPA) were placed into the preliminary first round.

Bracket

See also
Sun Belt Conference women's basketball tournament

References

Sun Belt Conference men's basketball tournament
Tournament
Sun Belt Conference men's basketball tournament
Sun Belt Conference men's basketball tournament